Kreuz is the German word for "Cross", and may refer to:

People
Al Kreuz (1898–1975), American football fullback
Arnošt Kreuz (1912–1974), Czech football forward
Emil Kreuz (1867–1932), German violinist, violist, teacher, conductor and composer
Erwin Kreuz (born 1927), German tourist who achieved international celebrity in the late 1970s for mistaking the city of Bangor, Maine for San Francisco, California
Markus Kreuz (born 1977), German football player who plays for WAC St. Andrä.
Wilhelm Kreuz (born 1949), former Austrian footballer

Places
Kreuz, historic German name for the town of Krzyż Wielkopolski, Poland
Hohes Kreuz, a municipality in Thuringia, Germany
 a village in the municipality of Maitenbeth, Germany
 a village in the municipality of Preetz, Schleswig-Holstein
a village in the municipality of Velden, Bavaria
 Krížová Ves, German: Kreuz, a village in north Slovakia

See also 

Creutz (disambiguation)
Kreutz (disambiguation)
Kreuzberg (disambiguation)
Kreuzer (disambiguation)
Krüzen (disambiguation)